Gábor Koncz (born 1938) is a Hungarian actor. In the US, he is well known for playing Vagran Rostavili, brother of the main antagonist Viktor Rostavili in Red Heat (1988).

Selected filmography
 Tales of a Long Journey (1963)
 Germinal (1963)
 Háry János (1965)
 Three Nights of Love (1967)
 Stars of Eger (1968)
 Pikemen (1975)
 Hungarians (1978)
 Hungarian Rhapsody (1979)
 The Assistant (1982)
 Do not Panic, Major Kardos (1982)
 Red Heat (1988)
 Metamorphosis (2007)
 The Door (2012)

Bibliography
 Burns, Bryan. World Cinema: Hungary. Fairleigh Dickinson University Press, 1996.

External links

1938 births
Living people
Hungarian male film actors